The Vrućevce Mosque is a cultural heritage monument built in 1826 in Vrućevce, Kamenica, Kosovo.
Built of clay-mortared stone, the mosque lies halfway between Vrućevce and Marovce, and the two villages share it as a place of worship. There is no minaret.

Description
The mosque is unusual in that the prayer hall is dual, with two rooms on either side of a narrow central corridor. One side room is for the imam to preach, the other serves as lodgings for imams from another village. the 70-cm-thick stone wall and the low height of the building speaks to its unusually recent construction, though the hall's interior is relatively standard.

References

Historic sites in Kosovo
Mosques in Kosovo
Kamenica, Kosovo
Religious buildings and structures completed in 1826